Melanie Greensmith (18 july 1964) is a fashion designer and property investor from Australia. She established the fashion label Wheels & Dollbaby in 1987 and is still going strong.

Early life 
Melanie Greensmith grew up in London, England. Her mother was a Bluebell showgirl who danced in Paris clubs, and her father was a first class English cricketer.

Career 
She created her business in Australia in 1987, without any formal training in fashion, art or design.

Melanie started her career with $5000AUD in a small store in the then hip Surry Hills area of Sydney. Which soon became a brand selling globally to the likes of luxury stores such as 'Harvey Nicoles', 'Harrods' & 'Selfridges' in London. Stores throughout the US and Australia also stocked her rock and roll clothing. Her rock and roll luxury aesthetic has been worn by some of the biggest stars in the world such as, Micheal Jackson, Kate Moss, Debbie Harry, Mick Jagger, Katy Perry, Amy Winehouse, Slash, Bob Dylan, Jerry Hall, Pamela Anderson, Chrissie Hynde and Britney Spears. Wheels and Dollbaby have been featured in many films, music videos and commercials. Wheels and Dollbaby since 2005 also has an enormously successful cardigan collaboration with Dita Von Teese that is a coveted and wildly collected item.

Personal life 
Melanie resides on her country estate on the outskirts of Perth with her long-term partner Mark McEntee, co founder of Aussie Rock and Roll power house 'The Divinyls'. Spreading her time between Sydney, London and Los Angeles. An active animal welfare advocate who raises money for Animal Australia and the Dog Refugee Home Perth. Her second passion to fashion is interior decorating and building her property portfolio globally.

Recognition 
Honoured In the West Australian Museum for her contribution and in and innovation to the fashion industry in 2021.

In 2008, Greensmith was honoured for her contributions to the Western Australian fashion industry when she was awarded a star on the Western Australia Fashion Walk of Fame on King Street in Perth.

References

Living people
Year of birth missing (living people)
Australian fashion designers
Australian women fashion designers
Australian women company founders
Australian company founders
Australian businesspeople